Elmer Freeman Herron (November 11, 1882 – death date unknown), nicknamed "Babe", was an American Negro league outfielder in the 1900s and 1910s.

A native of Indianapolis, Indiana, Herron made his Negro leagues debut in 1907 with the Indianapolis ABCs. He went on to play seven seasons with Indianapolis through 1913.

References

External links
 and Seamheads

1882 births
Year of death missing
Place of death missing
Indianapolis ABCs players
Baseball outfielders
Baseball players from Indianapolis